"That's Not Her Style" is a song by Billy Joel released as the fifth single from his album Storm Front, as well as the opening track on the album. It was written for Joel's then-wife Christie Brinkley.

The song was the lowest-charting single from the album, failing to crack the top 70 in the U.S. The song's music video features a live performance of the song at Yankee Stadium. A 4 track EP was also released.

Personnel 
 Billy Joel – lead and backing vocals, acoustic piano 
 Jeff Jacobs – synthesizers, backing vocals 
 David Brown – guitars
 Schuyler Deale – bass 
 Liberty DeVitto – drums 
 Don Brooks – harmonica
 Patricia Darcy Jones – backing vocals 
 Frank Floyd – backing vocals 
 Mick Jones – backing vocals 
 Richard Marx – backing vocals 
 Brian Ruggles – backing vocals
 Crystal Taliefero – backing vocals

Chart positions

References 

1990 singles
Billy Joel songs
Songs written by Billy Joel
Columbia Records singles
1989 songs
American rock songs
Song recordings produced by Mick Jones (Foreigner)